Ulrika Hedin (born 25 January 1952) is a Swedish equestrian. She competed in two events at the 1992 Summer Olympics.

References

External links
 

1952 births
Living people
Swedish female equestrians
Olympic equestrians of Sweden
Equestrians at the 1992 Summer Olympics
People from Fagersta Municipality
Sportspeople from Västmanland County